The Transmitter Stallupöner Allee, Berlin is a transmission site for medium wave 
radio broadcasts situated on the Stallupöner Allee ("Stallupone Avenue") in Berlin-Charlottenburg, Germany. This transmission site was established in 1948. It uses as aerial a 130-metre-high guyed steel framework mast with triangular section, which is insulated against ground. Until 1998 there was a second insulated guyed steel framework mast on the site. It was replaced by a small freestanding steel framework tower.
The transmission power of the medium wave transmitter was reduced during the nineties from 100 kilowatts to 2.5 kilowatts.

See also
 List of masts

External links
 
 
 http://www.skyscraperpage.com/diagrams/?b45611
 Picture on Google Maps

Buildings and structures in Berlin